ASA Chesapeake Charge is an amateur, American women's soccer club that played in the Women's Premier Soccer League, the second level of women's soccer in the United States founded in 2010. It also participated in the Women's Premier Soccer League Elite in 2012, the league's lone season. It played its home games in various stadiums, mostly on high-school and college grounds, in Chesapeake Bay area, and in the state of Maryland. Patrick Crawford is the manager of the club.

Year-by-Year

Players
The team roster consists of amateur, NCAA-compliant, players who also play in collegiate and high school leagues.
 ASA Chesapeake Charge team roster

Honors
Women's Premier Soccer League
Divisional champions: 2013, 2014, 2015
Conference runners-up: 2011, 2013
Women's Amateur: 2013
Women's Open runners-up: 2014, 2015

External links
 ASA Chesapeake Charge club website
 WPSL: ASA Chesapeake Charge

References

Association football clubs established in 2010
2010 establishments in Maryland
Women's Premier Soccer League Elite teams
Women's sports in Maryland